The 2007–08 season was the 111th season of competitive football by Heart of Midlothian, and their 25th consecutive season in the top level of Scottish football, competing in the Scottish Premier League. Hearts will also compete in the Scottish Cup and Scottish League Cup.

League table

Matches

Pre season
For the second consecutive pre-season Hearts visited Austria, although on this occasion the side also played four tour matches in Germany. Only one pre-season match was played in Edinburgh, a "glamour friendly" against FC Barcelona at Murrayfield Stadium, which attracted Hearts' largest ever attendance for a "home" match.

Scottish Premier League

Scottish Cup

Scottish League Cup

Transfers & loans

Several Lithuanian players left the club during the close-season, while two more Audrius Ksanavičius and Ričardas Beniušis arrived on loan from FBK Kaunas. Other summer signings included Rubén Palazuelos from Gimnástica de Torrelavega and Michael Stewart, who returned to the club after two seasons with rivals Hibernian. Scottish international goalkeeper Craig Gordon moved to Sunderland for £9 million in early August. This fee meant that Gordon was the most expensive Hearts and Scottish player ever, and the most expensive goalkeeper in British football history.

Managers

Just prior to the season's commencement Anatoly Korobochka and Stephen Frail were confirmed as the club's permanent coaching team.

After several other discouraging results, the Scottish media began to scrutinise 
why the team was not matching supporters expectations, with one particular area of interest being the coaching structure. As neither Korobochka or Bulgarian assistant coach Angel Chervenkov spoke fluent English, a translator was required to aid management and team communication, a situation Frail admitted was "frustrating" and "not ideal" after a 1–1 draw with Gretna.

Stephen Frail was appointed manager on 31 December following a difficult start to the season, although it was not made clear at the time that Frail would be manager until the end of the season.

On 22 May 2008 reports came out that caretaker manager Stephen Frail was on his way out of Tynecastle as he was not part of the new managerial structure at Hearts.

Season

Hearts began the season in a disappointing manner being defeated 1 -0 in the Edinburgh Derby with Hibernian.

On 31 December 2007, Romanov announced that, following five successive defeats which saw the club fall to 10th (third bottom) place in the league, the club would be looking to appoint a 'British-style' manager who would have complete control over team affairs. Since then, Stephen Frail has been the caretaker manager, although it was not made clear at the time that Frail would be manager until the end of the season.

Hearts were defeated 1–0 in the 4th round replay of the Scottish Cup by Motherwell after a 2–2 draw on 21 January 2008. Rangers defeated them 2–0 in the semi-final of the CIS Cup on 30 January at Hampden Park. Hearts then sold their top scorer, Andrius Velička, to Norwegian side Viking Stavanger on 26 February 2008. A 0–0 draw with Kilmarnock on 5 April 2008 meant that Hearts failed to make the "Top Six" of the SPL, for the first time since the split league format was introduced in 2001.

See also
List of Heart of Midlothian F.C. seasons

References

External links 
 Official Club website
 Complete Statistical Record

Heart of Midlothian
Heart of Midlothian F.C. seasons